Ordinary Lies is a British television drama series that was first broadcast on BBC One on 17 March 2015. The six-part first series, written by Danny Brocklehurst, is set in a car showroom. The second, also in six-parts, is set in the warehouse of a sports goods company based in Wales. The series executive producer is Nicola Shindler. The series was commissioned by Charlotte Moore for the BBC. In Australia, the series premiered on BBC First from 25 July 2015.

Plot

Series 1
JS Motors, a car dealership in Warrington, employs a number of 'ordinary' people, each with dark secrets. As each episode unravels, it becomes clear how quickly lies can escalate with shocking consequences.

Series 2
Coopers Outdoors, a Sports Goods Company based in Cardiff, has a number of workers who each hold a dark secret. As each episode unfolds, and each characters story is revealed, it becomes clear just how fast secrets can be revealed and the shocking aftermaths that can follow.

Cast

Main cast

Series 1 (2015)
 Max Beesley as Mike Hill, co-owner and boss of the company, who is having an affair with Beth
 Jo Joyner as Beth Corbin, deputy manager, whose husband has been missing for a year
 Michelle Keegan as Tracy Shawcross, a receptionist who becomes involved with drug trafficking
 Sally Lindsay as Kathy Kavanagh, Mike's secretary who becomes dissatisfied at her husband's inability to have sex
 Shazad Latif as Rick Ahmed, a mechanic who has sex with Mike's 15-year-old daughter, Ruby (episodes 1—4)
 Jason Manford as Marty McLean, a down on his luck salesman who lies that his wife has died to keep his job 
 Mackenzie Crook as Pete Blythman, a company salesman and former gambler

Series 2 (2016)
 Matt Di Angelo as Robert 'Fletch' Fletcher, a warehouse picker who finds his happy marriage threatened when he reunites with his father
 Kimberley Nixon as Holly Pryce, Jenna's PA and Neil's girlfriend, who believes everyone lives a more interesting life than she does
 Rebekah Staton as Wendy Walker, a forklift driver whose life is turned upside down when her former, abusive girlfriend returns
 Angela Griffin as Jenna Moss, general manager, who oversees both the warehouse and sales floors
 Joel Fry as Billy 'Toke' Tokington, warehouse manager who becomes a crime-fighting superhero at night
 Con O'Neill as Joe Brierley, Head of Sales who believes his wife is cheating on him and goes to great lengths to prove it
 Luke Bailey as Ash Driscoll, Coopers' new recruit who embarks on a toxic relationship with recent divorcee Ally
 Jennifer Nicholas as Ally, newly divorced call centre worker who catches the eye of Ash

Supporting cast

Series 1 (2015)
 George Bukhari as Fat Jason, a salesman who struggles with his weight
 Rebecca Callard as Grace, a young, lonely accountant who has a fling with Marty 
 Belinda Stewart-Wilson as Alison Hill, Mike's estranged wife
 Manjinder Virk as Marianne Morton, a receptionist who had an affair with Beth's husband
 Fisayo Akinade as Ziggy, a mechanic who works with Rick in the workshop
 Cat Simmons as Emma, a company accountant and bride-to-be, engaged to Jez
 Kris Mochrie as Jez, Emma's fiancé 
 Cherrelle Skeete as Viv Baxter, a receptionist who becomes involved with drug trafficking (episodes 1—2)
 Erin Shanagher as Katriana McLean, Marty's ailed wife, who he claims to be dead (episode 1)
 Tony Maudsley as Ralf Kavanagh, Kathy's husband (episode 3)
 Edward MacLiam as Niall, Kathy's sex buddy (episode 3)
 Holly Earl as Ruby Hill, Mike's 15-year-old daughter who becomes involved with Rick (episode 4)
 Ellie Haddington as Gina Corbin, Beth's mother-in-law and Dave's mother (episodes 5—6)
 Shaun Dooley as Dave Corbin, Beth's estranged husband (episode 6)

Series 2 (2016)
 Jill Halfpenny as Belinda Brierley, Joe's wife, whom he believes is cheating on him (episode 1)
 Griff Rhys Jones as Patrick, Fletch's father, whom Fletch believes walked out on him as a child (episode 5)
 Elen Rhys as Caz, Fletch's wife, who reignites the relationship between Fletch and his father
 Gareth Pierce as Karl Shelvey, a call centre worker who is best friends with Ray 
 Noel Sullivan as Neil, forklift driver and Holly's current boyfriend
 Ian Davies as Ray, a call centre worker who is best friends with Karl
 Ella Peel as Chrissy, a young girl whom Toke takes into his care (Episode 3)
 Elinor Crawley as Sarah-Jane, a PA appointed by Jenna following Holly's departure
 Aled Pugh as Lenny, a warehouse picker who is connected to a local gang of thugs (episode 4)

Episodes

Series 1 (2015)

Series 2 (2016)

References

External links
 
 

2015 British television series debuts
2016 British television series endings
2010s British drama television series
2010s British workplace television series
BBC high definition shows
BBC television dramas
Television series by Red Production Company
English-language television shows
Television shows set in the United Kingdom
2010s British workplace drama television series